William James Laidlay (12 August 1846 – 25 October 1912) was a Scottish first-class cricketer, barrister and artist.

The son of John Watson Laidlay, he was born in August 1846 at Calcutta in British India. He was educated in Scotland at the Loretto School, before going up to Peterhouse, Cambridge, from where he graduated in 1872. A student of the Middle Temple, he was called to the bar in April 1875. In the same year that he was called to the bar, Laidlay made a single appearance in first-class cricket for the North in the North v South fixture at Chelsea. Batting twice in the match, he was dismissed for 11 runs by James Lillywhite in the North's first-innings, while in their second-innings he was dismissed for 3 runs by W. G. Grace. He took three wickets across the match, dismissing Grace and Charles Buller in the South's first-innings, while in their second-innings he dismissed George Wyatt. He was a member of the Faculty of Advocates in 1874 and served on the Scottish courts circuit until 1878, after which he studied art in Paris from 1879–85. Laidlay was a founding member of the New English Art Club in 1885. He regularly exhibited his works at the Royal Academy of Arts, the Paris Salon, and the New Gallery. Laidlay died in October 1912 at Glenbrook House in Freshwater on the Isle of Wight. His brother was the amateur golfer, Johnny Laidlay.

References

External links

1846 births
1912 deaths
People from Kolkata
People educated at Loretto School, Musselburgh
Alumni of Peterhouse, Cambridge
Scottish cricketers
North v South cricketers
Members of the Middle Temple
Scottish barristers
Scottish landscape artists